In Greek mythology, Dino or Deino (Ancient Greek: Δεινώ means "dread" or "eddy, whirlpool") may refer to the following divinities:

 Deino, also called Persis,  one of the Graea who were daughters of the sea-deities Phorcys and Ceto. Her sisters were called Enyo and Pemphredo. They were old women from birth and had one eye and one tooth, and these they passed to each other in turn.
 Deino, a Malian naiad nymph who consorted with the Potamoi Sperchius and gave birth to the Spercheides including Diopatra who was loved by Poseidon.

Notes

References 

 Antoninus Liberalis, The Metamorphoses of Antoninus Liberalis translated by Francis Celoria (Routledge 1992). Online version at the Topos Text Project.
 Apollodorus, The Library with an English Translation by Sir James George Frazer, F.B.A., F.R.S. in 2 Volumes, Cambridge, MA, Harvard University Press; London, William Heinemann Ltd. 1921. ISBN 0-674-99135-4. Online version at the Perseus Digital Library. Greek text available from the same website.
 Gaius Julius Hyginus, Fabulae from The Myths of Hyginus translated and edited by Mary Grant. University of Kansas Publications in Humanistic Studies. Online version at the Topos Text Project.
Hesiod, Theogony from The Homeric Hymns and Homerica with an English Translation by Hugh G. Evelyn-White, Cambridge, MA.,Harvard University Press; London, William Heinemann Ltd. 1914. Online version at the Perseus Digital Library. Greek text available from the same website.

Naiads